This list of canal aqueducts in the United Kingdom covers aqueducts that have articles in Wikipedia. The actual number of canal aqueducts is much greater.

See also

:Category:Aqueducts in the United Kingdom
Navigable aqueduct
Canals of the United Kingdom
List of canal basins in the United Kingdom
List of canal junctions in the United Kingdom
List of canal locks in the United Kingdom
List of canal tunnels in the United Kingdom

References

 
Canal aqueducts
Canal aqueducts
Canal